Artem Hennadiyovych Dmytruk (born 28 June 1993) is a Ukrainian weight lifter and politician currently serving as a People's Deputy of Ukraine representing Ukraine's 133rd electoral district since 2019. Elected as a member of Servant of the People, he joined Smart Politics and was expelled from Servant of the People in November 2021, and later joined Restoration of Ukraine in 2022 after having been expelled from Smart Politics the same year.

Early life and career 
Artem Hennadiyovych Dmytruk was born on 28 June 1993 in the city of Koziatyn, in central Ukraine. He is a graduate of the National University Odesa Law Academy, specialising in jurisprudence. Prior to his election, he worked as an entrepreneur, porter, and bouncer. He was owner of the Barbell Barbell Gym and "baza" fitness clubs. He is co-founder of the "I'm an Odesan, and I don't care" non-governmental organisation, as well as a member of the "Ilya Muromets" non-governmental organisation.

Dmytruk has been a participant in several international weight-lifting championships. At the 2018 Crosslifting World Cup, he won a silver medal, and he has won the World Powerlifting Championship. He also participated in sambo, mixed martial arts, and boxing championships, and has received recognition from the Ukrainian government for his weight lifting prowess.

Political career 
Dmytruk ran in the 2019 Ukrainian parliamentary election as the candidate of Servant of the People for People's Deputy of Ukraine in Ukraine's 133rd electoral district. At the time of the election, he was an independent. He won the election with 32.66% of the vote, defeating his next-closest competitor, Viktor Baranskyi of Opposition Platform — For Life, who won 26.32% of the vote.

In the Verkhovna Rada (Ukraine's national parliament), Dmytruk joined the Servant of the People faction. He also became a member of the Verkhovna Rada Law Enforcement Committee and the inter-factional associations South Ukraine and For Accelerated European Integration of Ukrainian Business.

Dmytruk has been involved in a variety of controversies as People's Deputy. The day of his accession to the Verkhovna Rada, he voted for the appointment of Oleksiy Honcharuk as Prime Minister of Ukraine. Shortly after voting, when questioned by Radio Liberty journalists, he could not name who he had voted in as Prime Minister. He is also one of three People's Deputies to refuse a COVID-19 vaccine, along with Yuriy Kamelchuk and Yelyzaveta Bohutska.

Dmytruk has also been noted for his Russophilic positions, laying flowers in honour of 46 pro-Russian protesters who were killed during a fire at the Trade Union Building during the 2014 Odesa clashes in 2020, along with fellow Odesa People's Deputy Oleksiy Leonov. Dmytruk also appeared in a 2021 documentary about the 2014 clashes made by Anatoly Shariy.

In February 2020, Dmytruk got into a physical fight with fellow People's Deputy Serhiy Vlasenko of Batkivshchyna on the premises of the Verkhovna Rada building.

In November 2021, following the formation of Smart Politics by former Verkhovna Rada Chairman Dmytro Razumkov, Dmytruk was expelled from Servant of the People. Only one People's Deputy, Oleksiy Leonov, did not vote in favour of his expulsion. When asked, Dmytruk said he was not surprised by the procedure for his expulsion being initiated, saying that he "has a large number of conflicts with the party, both on voting and local issues in Odesa."

However, three months later, Dmytruk soon found himself expelled from Smart Politics after a fight in the Odesa City Council on 25 January 2022, in which Dmytruk injured three security guards. The fight occurred after Dmytruk forced his way into the City Council building with a group of supporters, with the intention of disrupting a meeting regarding the hand-over of a land plot to the State Border Guard Service of Ukraine. He was charged with hooliganism by the local police.

In May 2022, Dmytruk joined Restoration of Ukraine.

References 

1993 births
Living people
Ninth convocation members of the Verkhovna Rada
People from Vinnytsia Oblast
Servant of the People (political party) politicians
Ukrainian male weightlifters